The National Barn Dance is a 1944 American comedy film directed by Hugh Bennett and written by Lee Loeb and Hal Fimberg. The film stars Jean Heather, Charles Quigley, Robert Benchley, Mabel Paige, Charles Dingle and Pat Buttram. The film was released on September 24, 1944, by Paramount Pictures.

Plot

Cast        
Jean Heather as Betty
Charles Quigley as Johnny Burke
Robert Benchley as J.B. Mitcham
Mabel Paige as Mrs. Garvey
Charles Dingle as Mr. Garvey
Pat Buttram as Pat Buttram
Joe Kelly as Joe Kelly
Myrtle Wiseman as Myrtle Wiseman 
Scotty Wiseman as Scotty Wiseman 
The Dinning Sisters as Sister Singing Act
The Hoosier Hotshots as The Hoosier Hotshots
Frank Kettering as Frank 
Paul Trietsch as Hezzie 
Charles Ward as Gabe 
Ken Trietsch as Ken 
Luther W. Ossenbrink as Arkie 
National Barn Dance Troupe as Troupe Performers

References

External links
 

1944 films
American comedy films
1944 comedy films
Paramount Pictures films
American black-and-white films
1940s English-language films
Films directed by Hugh Bennett
1940s American films